Bao'an Stadium is a multi-purpose stadium located in Bao'an District, Shenzhen, China. Built to host matches of the women's football tournament at the 2011 Summer Universiade, the stadium has a capacity of 40,000 spectators. It has a height of 40 meters.

The stadium features a cantilever membrane roof to cover the seating areas and a network of steel supports which surround the stadium exterior, inspired by the extensive bamboo forests of southern China.

The stadium is served by the nearby Bao'an Stadium Station on the Shenzhen Metro's Line 1.

References

External links
Stadium Description

Sports venues in Shenzhen
Football venues in China
Bao'an District